Mohamad Shafiq Al-Hafiz bin Dawawi (born 12 February 1997) is a Malaysian professional footballer who plays as a midfielder for Malaysia Premier League club Kelantan.

References

External links
 

People from Kelantan
Living people
Malaysian footballers
Malaysia Super League players
UiTM FC players
Penang F.C. players
Association football midfielders
1997 births